John Foley (born 3 April 1997) is an Irish rugby union player. He can play across the back-row or as a lock and represents Young Munster in the All-Ireland League.

Early life
Born in Clonlara, County Clare, Foley first played underage rugby for UL Bohemians before attending St. Munchin's College. He won inter-provincial honours with Munster at Under-18 and Under-20 level, as well as representing Ireland at Under-18 level.

Munster
On 11 November 2016, Foley made his competitive debut for Munster when he came on as a substitute against the Māori All Blacks in a capped friendly in Thomond Park, which Munster won 27–14. He was released from the Munster Academy programme at the end of the 2017–18 season.

Ireland
On 17 March 2017, Foley made his debut for Ireland U20, starting for the side in their 14–10 defeat against England U20 in Donnybrook Stadium. Foley was also selected in the Ireland Under-20s squad for the 2017 World Rugby Under 20 Championship.

References

External links
Munster Academy Profile
U20 Six Nations Profile

Living people
1997 births
Rugby union players from County Clare
People educated at St Munchin's College
Irish rugby union players
Shannon RFC players
Munster Rugby players
Rugby union flankers
Rugby union number eights